The Ten Dollar Raise is a 1921 American silent comedy film directed by Edward Sloman and starring William V. Mong, Marguerite De La Motte, and Pat O'Malley.

Cast
 William V. Mong as Wilkins 
 Marguerite De La Motte as Dorothy 
 Pat O'Malley as Jimmy 
 Helen Jerome Eddy as Emily 
 Hallam Cooley as Don 
 Lincoln Plumer as Bates 
 Charles Hill Mailes as Stryker

References

Bibliography
 Taves, Brian. Thomas Ince: Hollywood's Independent Pioneer. University Press of Kentucky, 2012.

External links

1921 films
1921 comedy films
Silent American comedy films
Films directed by Edward Sloman
American silent feature films
1920s English-language films
American black-and-white films
1920s American films